Aaron McCormack (born 7 May 1971) is an Irish business executive, the CEO of BT Conferencing from 2007 to 2011.

Early life
Born to Diana Margaret (née Donaghey) and Dermot Joseph McCormack in Omagh, County Tyrone, he attended the local boys' Christian Brothers Grammar School. He became involved in the Alliance Party of Northern Ireland from an early age as a campaign worker. He has one brother, Gareth McCormack, a photographer and travel writer.

Political career
Upon entering Queen's University Belfast in 1989, he was elected leader of the Queen's University branch of the party. In 1990 he was elected leader of Young Alliance – the party's youth wing – and took a seat on the Party's National Executive. Throughout the early 1990s, a critical period in the Northern Ireland peace process, McCormack grew the party's youth wing to one of the largest of any political party in Northern Ireland. Upon graduation from QUB in late 1993, he begin working for the UK-based telecoms firm BT Group in London.  

As the Alliance Party had no elected representatives in the Westminster parliament, McCormack was the figurehead for the party in London, as well as various European and global political fora such as the European Liberal Democrat and Reform Party and its global equivalent Liberal International. He returned to Northern Ireland in 1996 and ran unsuccessfully as an Alliance Party candidate in the Foyle.

Upon moving to Washington D.C. later that year he focused his efforts on Irish-American politicians, determined to tell a different side to the Northern Ireland story than that portrayed by pro-republican organisations such as NORAID.

Business career
Within the BT Group, Aaron McCormack started in 1993 at the customer service and sales department, and then moved into the global networking and internet department in 1994, working in Seoul, Korea on a joint venture project with Samsung. He worked in Seattle, Washington throughout much of 1995 to manage BT's relationship with Microsoft, who were then rolling out MSN. In late 1996 he moved to Washington D.C. to lead the Internet services product marketing for Concert Communications Services, a global joint venture, originally launched June 1994 by BT Group and MCI Communications. McCormack remained in BT's international division, and for a time led the data services product management division at the revamped Concert, by 1998 a joint venture with AT&T that was ultimately unwound in October 2001. With the end of its AT&T venture, BT formed its Global Services division, where McCormack was Vice-President of the Global Products division until 2007. 

In 2006, McCormack was named a non-executive director of I.Net SpA, an Italian IT company listed on the Milan Bourse.

In 2007, McCormack was appointed chief executive officer of BT Conferencing – a separate company within BT responsible for managing BT's audio, video and web conferencing activities worldwide.  By his departure in March 2011 BT Conferencing had emerged as one of the world's largest collaboration services businesses with revenues exceeding $500m per annum.  BT Conferencing's leadership in the video conferencing market was cemented by their acquisition of Wire One Communications from private equity firm The Gores Group in 2008. He pushed videoconferencing (or more accurately telepresence) as a new way to reduce carbon footprint in corporate environments and opened 3 demonstration centers to give free demos of the company's video platform. In 2009, he signed a deal with BSNL to develop BT Conferencing in India. In January 2011, Jeff Prestel replaced Aaron McCormack as CEO of BT Conferencing.

After BT Conferencing, he has been COO of Vodafone North America, and is now the Executive Chairman of the software company Cased Dimensions.

Other roles

 2009: elected to the Young Global Leaders community of the World Economic Forum
 Since 2009:  judge in the Technology Category in the BT Young Scientist and Technology Exhibition held at the Royal Dublin Society in Dublin

Awards 

 1982: Callan Medal for the best project in electrical and electronic engineering by the Institute of Electrical Engineers.

References

External links
Aaron McCormack's homepage and blog

1971 births
Living people
Alliance Party of Northern Ireland politicians
Businesspeople from Northern Ireland
Irish chief executives
People educated at Christian Brothers Grammar School, Omagh
People from Omagh
British Telecom people